Kaliningrad–Severny is a suburban rail station on Pobedy Square (Victory Square) in Kaliningrad.

History
The station was built in 1920 on the site of Steindammer Tor as part of a railway linking the networks north & south of the city. It replaced the previous Crantzer Bahnhof & Samlandbahnhof. A 5-storey entrance building facing south onto Hansaplatz was designed by architect Martin Stallmann in the modernist style.

During World War II, on 24 June 1942, the first and largest group of Jewish deportees from East Prussia, comprising 465 Jewish men, women and children, were loaded onto trains by  members of the SS at the freight depot of the city's northern station and sent to the Maly Trostenets extermination camp near Minsk.

After the war, the station was closed and the main building, which had been damaged badly by incendiary bombs, was rebuilt as offices. In 1964, the station was reopened to serve trains running to the seaside. A new ticket office was built. In 1976 the station saw its first electric trains, beginning the Elektrichka network of suburban trains.

On 24 June 2011, a memorial plaque was dedicated at the station to Jewish deportees from Königsberg and the province of East Prussia.

Layout

5: Attic with storage for offices
4-2: Offices
1: Shops. The central section once contained the ticket hall, but now has a bank & the entrance to the offices.
0: The new ticket office & terminus platforms. 2 of the platforms have had their tracks dismantled, & the space is occupied by a TЭ-class steam locomotive.
-1: External waiting area for the through platform.
-2: Through platform

References

Buildings and structures in Kaliningrad
Railway stations in Kaliningrad Oblast
Cultural heritage monuments of regional significance in Kaliningrad Oblast